Jason Cranford is the founder of the non-profit Flowering H.O.P.E Foundation. The foundation assists people with debilitating medical conditions by assisting with doctors appointments, education and support groups.

Cranford is a leading medical cannabis caregiver in the state of Colorado with over 350 patients. He is from Georgia and testified at their legislative hearings. The bill was named Haleigh's Hope in honor of Haleigh Cox in the state of Georgia. He has been recognized with numerous awards and distinctions for his work in the field; for example, he won the Hope Foundation Award at the 2014 Cannabis Business Awards. He is an expert in extractions and infusions using a variety of solvents and delivery systems.

References

Year of birth missing (living people)
Living people
American cannabis activists
American founders
People from Colorado